Anthony Jones (born 7 April 1955) is a Barbadian sprinter. He competed in the men's 100 metres at the 1984 Summer Olympics.

References

1955 births
Living people
Athletes (track and field) at the 1984 Summer Olympics
Barbadian male sprinters
Olympic athletes of Barbados
Place of birth missing (living people)